Journey Behind the Falls (known until the early 1990s as the Scenic Tunnels) is an attraction in Niagara Falls, Ontario, Canada located in the Table Rock Centre beside the Canadian Horseshoe Falls. It is open year round and run by the Niagara Parks Commission.

Summary
Journey consists of an observation platform and series of tunnels near the bottom of the Horseshoe Falls on the Canadian shore of the Niagara River. The tunnels and platform can be reached by elevators from the street level entrance. The tour is unguided.

The two tunnels extend approximately  behind the waterfall and allow visitors to view water cascading in front of the open cave entrances. Earlier in the attraction's history visitors were permitted far closer to the portals' edge, however, the ongoing erosion of the gorge itself left these areas with insufficient rock remaining on the sides, and new tunnels were built further back. Barricades now exist further back from the ledge at the end of the tunnels to ensure visitor safety.

The observation deck provides a vantage point looking up with the falls to the right, allowing photographers a full view of the famous landmark. The deck is sprayed with water from the cascade so visitors are provided with plastic raincoats prior to their descent.

Gallery

References

External links

 Journey Behind The Falls

Culture of Niagara Falls, Ontario
Niagara Falls
Tourist attractions in Niagara Falls, Ontario
Niagara Parks Commission